Mont Mégantic (Abenaki: Namesokanjik) is a monadnock located in Québec, Canada, about  north of the border between Québec and the U.S. states of Maine and New Hampshire. 
Mégantic is on the border of the regional county municipalities of Le Granit and Le Haut-Saint-François. Its summit is the highest point of the latter. Many geologists believe that Mont Mégantic is a member of the Monteregian Hills formed by the New England hotspot, as it has the same mechanism and depth of intrusion.

Mont Mégantic stands within the watershed of the Saint Lawrence River, which drains into the Gulf of Saint Lawrence. The east side of Mégantic drains into Rivière Victoria, thence into Lac Mégantic, the Chaudière River, and the St. Lawrence. The rest of Mégantic drains into Rivière Au Saumon (Salmon River), thence into the Saint-François River, and the St. Lawrence.

Observatoire du Mont Mégantic (OMM) is located on the mountain's summit, which is the highest point in Québec accessible by road. The mountain is in the middle of the  Parc national du Mont-Mégantic. The annual Tour de Beauce bicycle race is routed over Mont Mégantic.

References

External links

Megantic
Stocks (geology)
Landforms of Estrie
Igneous petrology of Quebec
Canada geography articles needing translation from French Wikipedia